James Cox (died 1805) was a merchant and political figure in Nova Scotia. He represented Shelburne County in the Legislative Assembly of Nova Scotia from 1799 to 1805.

A loyalist, he came to Nova Scotia from Virginia, settling in Shelburne around 1792. Cox was married twice: first to Elizabeth and then to Margaret Sorrel in 1799. He served as a justice of the peace. With George Gracie, he was co-owner of the privateer ship Nelson. Cox apparently returned to New York sometime between September 1803 and November 1805.

His grandson George A. Cox also served in the assembly.

References 

Year of birth missing
1805 deaths
British emigrants to pre-Confederation Nova Scotia
Nova Scotia pre-Confederation MLAs
Loyalists who settled Nova Scotia